Euros cervina is a moth of the family Noctuidae described by Henry Edwards in 1890. It is found in riparian areas in the United States in western Oregon and northern California.

The length of the forewings is about 10 mm.

External links
A review of the genus Euros Hy. Edwards (Lepidoptera: Noctuidae: Apameiini) with description of one new species

Apameini